The Central District of Minudasht County is a district (bakhsh) in Minudasht County, Golestan Province, Iran. At the 2006 census, its population was 69,272, in 17,085 families.  The District has one city: Minudasht.  The District has three rural districts (dehestan): Chehel Chay Rural District, Kuhsarat Rural District, and Qaleh Qafeh Rural District.

References 

Districts of Golestan Province
Minudasht County